John St Clair may refer to:

John St Clair, Master of Sinclair (1683–1750), Scottish heir apparent and British MP for Dysart Burghs
John St. Clair (born 1977), American football offensive tackle